was a Quasi-National Park in Ōita and Miyazaki Prefectures, Japan. It was in 2017 incorporated in to the Sobo, Katamuki and Okue Biosphere Reserve.

The Quasi-National Park borders two homonymous Prefectural Parks, namely the Sobo Katamuki Prefectural Natural Park (Ōita) and Sobo Katamuki Prefectural Natural Park (Miyazaki).

Related municipalities
 Miyazaki: Gokase, Hinokage, Nobeoka, Takachiho
 Ōita: Bungo-ōno, Saiki, Taketa

See also

 List of national parks of Japan

References

External links
 Map of Sobo-Katamuki Quasi-National Park (Miyazaki Prefecture)
 Maps of Sobo-Katamuki Quasi-National Park (Ōita Prefecture)

National parks of Japan
Parks and gardens in Ōita Prefecture
Parks and gardens in Miyazaki Prefecture
Protected areas established in 1965
1965 establishments in Japan